Stick Man, written by former Children's Laureate Julia Donaldson and illustrated by Axel Scheffler, is a children's story about an anthropomorphic wooden stick who becomes separated from his family home and his Odyssey-like adventure to return there. He is eventually reunited with his family in the "family tree" as a result of his interaction with Father Christmas. It takes place in England. 

Stick Man has sold over 2 million copies worldwide and has been adapted into a short animated film and a successful stage play.

Awards
2008 Roald Dahl Funny Prize
2009 Scottish Children's Book Awards shortlist

Adaptations
The book was adapted into a short animated film by Jeroen Jaspaert and Daniel Snaddon in 2015, featuring the voice talents of Martin Freeman, Sally Hawkins, Jennifer Saunders, Hugh Bonneville and Rob Brydon and produced by Magic Light Pictures, the production team responsible for the Oscar-nominated short films The Gruffalo and Room on the Broom. The film premiered on BBC 1 on 25 December 2015 and was watched by 9.27 million viewers, being the fourth most-watched programme in the United Kingdom that day.

A stage play has also been created based on the original book which has been praised by Time Out and the Independent as well as an audio edition narrated by Imelda Staunton.

See also
 List of Christmas-themed literature

References

External links
 stickmanofficial.com, the book's website
 juliadonaldson.co.uk, the author's website
 stickmanlive.com, the stage play's website
 magiclightpictures.com, the production company behind the film adaptation

British picture books
Children's fiction books
2008 children's books
Macmillan Publishers books
British children's books
Donaldson and Scheffler